Handia may refer to:

 Handia, Uttar Pradesh, India
 Handia, Madhya Pradesh, India
 Handia (drink), from India
 Handia, the Basque name of the 2017 film, Giant